List of World War II Infantry Anti-tank weapons of Germany

Anti-Tank Weapons 
Panzerbüchse (German: "anti-tank rifles")
Panzerbüchse 35 (polnisch) (PzB 35(p)) - a captured Polish Kb ppanc wz.35 anti-tank rifle  
Panzerbüchse 38 anti-tank rifle
Panzerbüchse 39 anti-tank rifle
Panzerbüchse Boyes - a captured British Boys 0.55 Anti-tank rifle

Rocket weapons
Raketen-Panzerbüchse 43 ('rocket tank rifle 43'), aka Püppchen ('dolly')
Raketen-Panzerbüchse 54, aka "Panzerschreck"

Recoilless guns
Panzerfaust 30 klein, aka Faustpatrone ('fist cartridge')
Panzerfaust 30
Panzerfaust 60
Panzerfaust 100

Miscellaneous
Sturmpistole
Panzerschreck

World War II infantry anti-tank weapons of Germany